Trant's Raid was the Portuguese recapture of the city of Coimbra from the French on 6 October 1810 during the Peninsular War. The assault was undertaken by a Portuguese militia led by Colonel Nicholas Trant, an Irish officer in the British Army.

Battle
Marshal André Masséna's army had captured Coimbra and established a base there. On 7 October Trant and 4,000 Portuguese militia recaptured the city. French losses were 8 killed and 400 able-bodied soldiers captured. About 3,500 sick and wounded, plus several hundred medical and service personnel also surrendered. Trant's losses were only 3 men killed and another 26 men wounded.

Aftermath
As the new governor of the city, he remained in possession of the city all winter while the French carried out their futile blockade of the Lines of Torres Vedras

Notes

References

External links
 

Battles of the Peninsular War